Radical Outdoor Challenge was a television show on ESPN that aired in 1993 that was hosted by Ryan Seacrest in his first major television role as well as Jerry Bernardo and Sharon Swainson. The show was created by Seals Communications Corporation (Sealsco).

The show featured three children competing against each other in various outdoor competitions held at Camp Thunder near Thomaston, Georgia.  Various graphical non sequiturs were interspersed with the footage of the show, intended to give the show a "radical" quality.  An episode of the show was featured in a 2006 episode of Cheap Seats on ESPN Classic.

References

1993 American television series debuts
1993 American television series endings
ESPN original programming
American sports television series